The Broad Top Area Coal Miners Museum is a museum documenting the history of the isolated Broad Top Coal Field in south central Pennsylvania with Ron Morgan as its curator. The museum is operated by the Broad Top Area Coal Miners Historical Society. The Museum and entertainment center was originally housed in the Reality theater in Robertsdale, Pennsylvania. 
which the group purchased in 1991 and opened in 1992. In 2008 the museum moved to the former Methodist church in Robertsdale, Pennsylvania while the entertainment center remained in the theater.

The museum complex contains a large collection of mining memorabilia about the Broad Top Coal Field. The museum also contains a vast collection of the Huntingdon and Broad Top Railroad memorabilia and has the most of the archives for the H&BT.

External links
Broad Top Area Coal Miners Museum - Broad Top Area Coal Miners Society

Notes

Museums in Huntingdon County, Pennsylvania
History museums in Pennsylvania
Mining museums in Pennsylvania
Railroad museums in Pennsylvania
Coal museums in the United States
1992 establishments in Pennsylvania
Museums established in 1992